Cherry Bank, also known as the  Dr. A. L. Ankeny House  and  Lindmeier ("Cherrybank"), is an historic residence located in Clinton, Iowa, United States.   The Italianate style house was built in 1871 by Dennis Warren.  He meant the house for his favorite nephew, but Dr. Ankeny bought and lived in the house instead.  The two-story structure is composed of red brick and has buff-colored brick for the quoins and the window arches.  It features a cornice, hipped roof, and a widow's walk.  The original front porch was removed in the 1920s.  It was listed on the National Register of Historic Places in 1999.

References

Houses completed in 1871
Houses in Clinton County, Iowa
Houses on the National Register of Historic Places in Iowa
National Register of Historic Places in Clinton County, Iowa
Buildings and structures in Clinton, Iowa
Italianate architecture in Iowa